Megachile relata is a species of leafcutter bee in the family Megachilidae. It is native to southern Asia and was described by Frederick Smith in 1879.

References

Relata
Insects described in 1879